Shaida Mohammad Abdali (born on 8 November 1978 in Kandahar) is the Afghan Ambassador to Japan. He was formerly the Afghan Ambassador to India from 2012 to 2018.

Early life and education 
Abdali was born on 8 November 1978 in Kandahar.

He has M.A. in Strategic Security Studies from the National Defense University, and a PhD from the Jawaharlal Nehru University.

Career 
Abdali was the Afghan Ambassador to India resident in New Delhi, and also the non-resident Ambassador to Bhutan, Maldives and Nepal. He was subsequently nominated by President Hamid Karzai to serve as the Deputy National Security Advisor and Special Assistant to the former President of Afghanistan. Ambassador Abdali provided the President with policy and oversight advice on national security issues. In this way he was fully active in Afghan politics.

In January 2021, Abdali was appointed as the Afghan Ambassador to Japan. He had been the Ambassador-designate in Tokyo without presenting his letter of credence for around four months because of the COVID-19 outbreak in Japan, especially the Japanese government has placed its capital, which includes the Imperial Palace, under a state of emergency due to COVID-19 on April 25. Abdali eventually presented his letter of credence to Emperor Naruhito at the Imperial Palace on May 27.

Despite the Fall of Kabul to the Taliban in August 2021, Tokyo still hosts Abdali as the Ambassador Extraordinary and Plenipotentiary of Afghanistan.

Personal life 
He is married and has four children.

Works published 
 Afghanistan Pakistan India: A Paradigm Shift (July 2016), Pentagon Press,

References

External links 
 Ambassador's Biography by the Embassy of Afghanistan, Tokyo
 

Ambassadors of Afghanistan to Bhutan
Ambassadors of Afghanistan to India
Ambassadors of Afghanistan to Japan
Ambassadors of Afghanistan to the Maldives
Ambassadors of Afghanistan to Nepal
Jawaharlal Nehru University alumni
Pashtun people
People from Kandahar
1978 births
Living people